Enrico Pozzo (born 12 February 1981) is an Italian male artistic gymnast and part of the national team.  He participated at the 2004 Summer Olympics 2008 Summer Olympics and 2012 Summer Olympics.

References

1981 births
Living people
People from Biella
Italian male artistic gymnasts
Gymnasts at the 2012 Summer Olympics
Olympic gymnasts of Italy
Gymnasts at the 2008 Summer Olympics
Gymnasts at the 2004 Summer Olympics
Mediterranean Games silver medalists for Italy
Mediterranean Games medalists in gymnastics
Competitors at the 2001 Mediterranean Games
Gymnasts of Centro Sportivo Aeronautica Militare
Sportspeople from the Province of Biella